Pont Rug railway station was located to the east of Caernarfon, Gwynedd, Wales, where the A4086 crosses the Afon Seiont.

The station opened in 1880. It consisted of a single short platform with no goods facilities other than small parcels. It closed from January 1917 to July 1919 as a wartime economy measure, then closed completely in 1930.

Summer excursions to Llanberis passed through until September 1962 and freight lingered on until the line closed in September 1964. The tracks were lifted in early 1965.

In 1958 the station building was in use as a dwelling.

References

Sources

External links
 The station on a navigable OS Map in National Library of Scotland
 The station and line in Rail Map Online
 The station and line CLS with mileages in Railway Codes
 Images of the station in Yahoo
 The station and line in Rail Chronology
 The station and line in Signalling Record Society
 1957 railtour including the line in Manchester Railway Society
 5 May 1957 railtour record in Six Bells Junction

Disused railway stations in Gwynedd
Railway stations in Great Britain opened in 1880
Railway stations in Great Britain closed in 1917
Railway stations in Great Britain opened in 1919
Railway stations in Great Britain closed in 1930
Former London and North Western Railway stations
Llanrug